Wat Pathum Khongkha Ratchaworawihan, or simple known as  Wat Pathum Khongkha is a second class royal temple in the Talat Noi area of Bangkok's Chinatown near Tri Mit Road, which leads to Odeon Circle, the beginning of Yaowarat Road.

It is an ancient temple since Ayutthaya period. Until the early Rattanakosin period corresponding to the King Rama I's reign. The King's younger brother Prince Maha Sura Singhanat renovated the entire monastery as a merit making dedicated to his father Mr. Thongdee and renamed the temple to Wat Pathum Khongkha (temple of lotuses in water). Its formerly named as Wat Sampheng according to its location Sampheng, the Chinese and commercial quarters since those days.

Background 
This temple used to be a execution ground of Prince Kraisorn, who committed a rebellion against King Rama III. He was executed by beating with sandalwood cudgel at the back of the neck on a stone, which was the execution of royal family member according to ancient traditions. At present, this stone is still preserved in the temple. The khlong (canal) in front of the temple was a holy site as the ashes of cremated members of the royal family and the royal white elephants are scattered here.

The ordination hall made of brick and mortar has a principal Buddha statue overcoming temptations be decorated with the king suit named Phra Phuttha Mahachanok (พระพุทธมหาชนก) enshrined inside. The doors and windows of  sermon hall are of beautiful lacquered gold leaf painting patterns.

In addition, the area behind the temple next to the Chao Phraya River also the site of a small chic guesthouse, which used to be as a location for filming  Bangkok Traffic (Love) Story, a Thai romantic-comedy film in 2009, by assuming as the residence of Loong, a lead role male character.

References

External links

Samphanthawong district
Buddhist temples in Bangkok
Thai Theravada Buddhist temples and monasteries
Registered ancient monuments in Bangkok
Buildings and structures on the Chao Phraya River